Hnilčík is a village and municipality in the Spišská Nová Ves District in the Košice Region of central-eastern Slovakia.

History
In historical records the village was first mentioned in 1315.

Geography
The village lies at an altitude of 608 metres and covers an area of 23.23 km2.
In 2011 Hnilčík had a population of 543 inhabbittants.

Genealogical resources

The records for genealogical research are available at the state archive "Statny Archiv in Levoca, Slovakia"

 Roman Catholic church records (births/marriages/deaths): 1780-1897 (parish A)
 Lutheran church records (births/marriages/deaths): 1783-1896 (parish B)

See also
 List of municipalities and towns in Slovakia

External links
http://en.e-obce.sk/obec/hnilcik/hnilcik.html
http://www.hnilcik.ocu.sk
https://web.archive.org/web/20071116010355/http://www.statistics.sk/mosmis/eng/run.html
Surnames of living people in Hnilcik

Villages and municipalities in Spišská Nová Ves District